Ennui is another word for boredom.

Ennui may also refer to:

"Ennui" (sonnet), by Sylvia Plath 
"Ennui" (VersaEmerge song)
"Ennui", a painting by Walter Sickert
"Ennui", also called Boredom, a Russian song by Modest Mussorgsky, part of his Sunless (song cycle) 
"Ennui", song by Lou Reed
 Ennui, a character from The Ridonculous Race
Ennui, a fictional town from The French Dispatch

See also
 Boredom (disambiguation)